The 1939–40 Gauliga Ostmark was the second season of the Gauliga Ostmark, the first tier of football in German-annexed Austria from 1938 to 1945, officially referred to as Ostmark.

SK Rapid Wien won the championship and qualified for the 1940 German football championship where it lost 2–1 after extra time in the semi-final to Dresdner SC. Rapid went on to win the third-place play-off against SV Waldhof Mannheim.

The Gauliga Ostmark and Gauliga Donau-Alpenland titles from 1938 to 1944, excluding the 1944–45 season which was not completed, are recognised as official Austrian football championships by the Austrian Bundesliga.

Table
The 1939–40 season saw one new club in the league, FC Wien.

Results

References

External links
 Das Deutsche Fussball Archiv  Historic German league tables

Gauliga Ostmark seasons
Austria
1939–40 in Austrian football
1939–40 in German football leagues